The gift-exchange game is a game that was introduced by George Akerlof and Janet Yellen to model labor relations. The simplest form of the game involves two players – an employee and an employer. The employer first decides whether to award a higher salary to the employee. The employee then decides whether they will work harder or not due to the salary change. Like trust games, gift-exchange games are used to study reciprocity for human subject research in social psychology and economics. If the employer pays extra salary and the employee puts extra effort, then both players are better off than otherwise. The relationship between an investor and an investee has been investigated as the same type of a game.

Equilibrium analysis

The extra effort in gift-exchange games is modeled to be a negative payoff if not compensated by salary. The IKEA effect of own extra work is not considered in the payoff structure of this game. Therefore, this model rather fits labor conditions, which are less meaningful for the employees.

Like in trust games, game-theoretic solution for rational players predicts that employees’ effort will be minimum for one-shot and finitely repeated interactions. Therefore, there is no incentive for the employer to pay a higher salary. If the employer pays a higher salary, it is irrational for the employee to put extra effort, since effort will reduce his or her payoff. It is also irrational for the employee to put extra effort while receiving a lower salary. Therefore, the minimum salary and the minimum effort is the equilibrium of this game.

The payoff matrix of the gift-exchange game has the same structure as the payoff matrix of Prisoner's dilemma. The difference constitutes by the sequentiality of gift-exchange game.

Some experimental methods and results 

A positive relationship between salary and effort has been observed in a large number of gift-exchange experiments. This behavior obviously deviates from the equilibrium. In a game of one employer and one employee, an experiment on 84 undergraduate students from the University of Amsterdam showed a rate of only 23.8% of employee's minimal effort for high salary. Another experiment with students from Tilburg University showed that only 33% of games ended up in the Nash equilibrium with minimal salary and minimal effort. Data from another experiment on 123 students from University of Nottingham showed a rate of 69% for high salary being paid by employer in advance.

Fehr, Kirchsteiger and Riedl (1993, QJE) designed a market in which "employers" and "employees" do not meet. All wages and effort and "employees" are put in different rooms for many experiments, and are told that the counterparties of each transaction are different, and both sides keep "anonymous" transactions from beginning to end. In this way, the influence of expectations of both sides on the "long-term future" is excluded, and the choice of the level of effort of "employees" is completely self-conscious. According to the traditional economic view, employees will be willing to accept any wage greater than 0, and provide the minimum level of effort after receiving the salary. However, the experimental results show that employers always offer wages much higher than the minimum level, while employees almost always provide efforts much higher than the minimum level. This proves that even if there are no other supervision and punishment mechanisms, the wage level in the labor market is often higher than the market-clearing price for some "fair" and "goodwill" motives in exchange for the labor provider's initiative and loyalty.

The experiment of charness (2000, JEBO) wanted to explore what would happen if the benefit of high wages was not given by the employer but a random result or a third party. The results of this experiment are as follows: (1) if wages are generated randomly, employees usually give extra efforts to show "fairness" or compensation, considering that they are after all the employer's money. (2) If, at almost the same income level, employees are told that the wage level is determined by the experimenter, they will think that they don't have to pay a lot of responsibility for the "loss" to the employer, so they will relatively reduce their efforts.

Gneezy and List (2006, Econometrica) set the scene in two volunteer activities. One was to input bibliographic information to the library, the other was to raise funds for a foundation. In both experiments, one group was given a high salary and the other was not. Then, they observed the labor efficiency data. The results showed that the high wage group performed well at the beginning, but then went downhill. When the output per wage was finally calculated, the high wage group was lower than the low wage group, which seemed to prove another feature of "reciprocal behavior", that is, as time goes on, preferential treatment will be taken for granted, thus reducing the willingness of employees to supply labor.

Work Field usage
The gift exchange model is used to explain workers' effort and wages provided by firms in the real world, especially involuntary unemployment. George A. Akerlof described labor contracts as "partial gift exchange". Unlike what is depicted in the simple model above, in real life, employees may exceed the minimum work required and firms may pay more than the market-clearing wage. According to Akerlof's model, this is because the worker’s effort not only depends on the effort itself, wage rate if employed, and the unemployed benefit if unemployed, but also the norm for effort. Thus, to affect these norms, firms may pay more.

Other fields usages 
The gift-exchange game is not only used in the workplace but can also be practiced in other areas. For example, in the field of charitable giving, when a charity first makes a gift to a potential donor as part of a donation solicitation, more generous gifts are associated with higher frequency donations, resulting in more donations to the charity.

See also 
Trust game
Prisoner's dilemma
Ultimatum game
Efficiency wage

References

Non-cooperative games
Game theory game classes